Gay Street is a short, angled street that marks off one block of Greenwich Village in the New York City borough of Manhattan. Although coincidentally encompassed by the Stonewall National Monument, the street's name does not refer to the LGBT character of Greenwich Village, or to any other LGBT issues. Rather, the name may come from a family named Gay who owned land or lived there in colonial times: a newspaper of May 11, 1775 contains a classified ad where an "R. Gay", living in the Bowery, offers a gelding for sale.

Since it was once too narrow to be a full-fledged street, the City of New York widened it in 1833. As a result, Federal houses of 1826-1833 line the west side of the street, while on the east side, following a hiatus caused by the Panic of 1837, the houses are from 1844-1860, with remnants of Greek Revival detailing in doorways and window surrounds.

The street extends from Christopher Street one block south to Waverly Place, between and roughly parallel to Sixth and Seventh Avenues.  It runs through the site of a brewery owned by Wouter van Twiller, who succeeded Peter Minuit as Governor of New Netherland in 1633. The name first appeared officially in the Common Council minutes for April 23, 1827, which record a health inspector's complaint against a privy belonging to one A. S. Pell of Gay Street.

The 1943 movie A Night to Remember portrays 13 Gay Street as the address of the building where most of the action, including a murder, occurs. The opening shots of Cyndi Lauper's video for "Girls Just Want to Have Fun" were shot on Gay Street in September 1983. In 1996, Sheryl Crow made a video on Gay Street for the song "A Change Would Do You Good."

On Good Friday, April 14, 2017, an anonymous person chained a wooden cross to a street sign on the sidewalk of Gay St. This anonymous person moved the cross to different parts of the street for several days. On April 23rd, residents of the street painted the cross in bright, rainbow colors, and added the word "Love," to the top of the cross.

See also
Doyers Street, another historically short and crooked street in Manhattan

References
Notes

Bibliography

External links

Streets in Manhattan
Greenwich Village